Brock is an unincorporated community in Darke County, in the U.S. state of Ohio.

History
A post office called Brock was established in 1850, and remained in operation until 1906. In addition to the post office, Brock had its own schoolhouse, church, and town hall.

References

Unincorporated communities in Darke County, Ohio
Unincorporated communities in Ohio